Ozzy & Jack's World Detour is an American reality television series starring Ozzy Osbourne and his son Jack Osbourne. The first season, consisting of 10 episodes, premiered on July 24, 2016, on History. A second season of 10 episodes began airing on A&E on November 8, 2017. On January 23, 2018, Jack revealed on his official Instagram page that the series had been picked up for a third season. The eight-episode third season premiered on A&E on June 13, 2018, with Jack's sister Kelly Osbourne joining the cast.

During each episode, the Osbournes, who are interested in history, visit one or more sites to learn about their history from experts and explore unusual or quirky aspects of their background.

Series overview

Episodes

Season 1 (2016)

Season 2 (2017–18)

Season 3 (2018)

References

External links 
 Ozzy & Jack's World Detour at History.com
 Ozzy & Jack's World Detour at AETV.com
Ozzy & Jack's World Detour at AXS TV
 

2010s American reality television series
2016 American television series debuts
History (American TV channel) original programming
A&E (TV network) original programming
2018 American television series endings